Christopher Braun (born 15 July 1991) is a German professional footballer who plays as a right back for Liga I club CFR Cluj.

Honours
SG Wattenscheid 09
 Westphalia Cup: 2015–16

CFR Cluj
Supercupa României runner-up: 2022

External links
 
 Sport.de Profile

1991 births
Living people
German sportspeople of Ghanaian descent
German footballers
Footballers from Hamburg
Association football fullbacks
SV Wilhelmshaven players
FC St. Pauli players
VfB Oldenburg players
SG Wattenscheid 09 players
Fortuna Sittard players
OFI Crete F.C. players
FC Botoșani players
CFR Cluj players
Regionalliga players
Eerste Divisie players
Super League Greece players
Liga I players
German expatriate footballers
German expatriate sportspeople in the Netherlands
Expatriate footballers in the Netherlands
German expatriate sportspeople in Greece
Expatriate footballers in Greece
German expatriate sportspeople in Romania
Expatriate footballers in Romania